The 2019 Hawthorn Football Club season was the club's 95th season in the Australian Football League and 118th overall, the 20th season playing home games at the Melbourne Cricket Ground, the 19th season playing home games at the University of Tasmania Stadium, the 15th season under head coach Alastair Clarkson, and the 1st season with Ben Stratton as club captain. A 19-point loss to Sydney in round 14 meant that Hawthorn could not match their 15–7 record from 2018. A 70-point win over Gold Coast meant that for a tenth-consecutive season Hawthorn won at least 10 games. Hawthorn finished the season in ninth-place with a 11–11 record, thus missing the finals for the second time in the last three seasons.

Club summary 
The 2019 AFL season was the 123rd season of the VFL/AFL competition since its inception in 1897; having entered the competition in 1925, it was be the 95th season contested by the Hawthorn Football Club. Tasmania and iiNet continued as the club's two major sponsors, as they have done since 2006 and 2013 respectively, while Adidas continued to manufacture the club's on-and-off field apparel, as they have done since 2013. Hawthorn continued its alignment with the Box Hill Hawks Football Club in the Victorian Football League, allowing Hawthorn-listed players to play with the Box Hill Hawks when not selected in AFL matches.

Senior personnel 
On 30 August 2018, it was announced that assistant coach Brett Ratten would be joining  as an assistant coach following the conclusion of the 2018 season. On 4 October 2018, it was announced that Chris Newman would be elevated from coach of Victorian Football League affiliate Box Hill Hawks to an assistant coach. Max Bailey was appointed as coach of Box Hill. On 6 October 2018, It was announced that coach Alastair Clarkson had signed a 3-year contract extension, keeping Clarkson at the club until the end of the 2022 season. On 3 November 2018, Torin Baker was announced as the new development coach, filling the role previously held by Max Bailey. On 27 November 2018, It was announced that Jarryd Roughead would not continue on as captain in 2019. Ben Stratton would be named as Roughead's successor on 28 February 2019.

Playing list changes

Trades 

 Draft picks accurate at the time of the trade.

Free agency

Additions

Draft

AFL draft

Rookie draft

Retirements and delistings

2019 player squad

JLT Community series

Home & Away season 
Hawthorn's fixture was released on November 1.

Ladder

Awards, records and milestones

Awards
Club awards
 Peter Crimmins Medal: James Worpel
 Most consistent player: Jarman Impey
 Most promising player: Mitchell Lewis
 Best clubman: Jonathon Ceglar
 Best first year player (debut season): Oliver Hanrahan

Records

Club records
 Most contested marks: 317 – Jarryd Roughead
 Most marks inside 50: 633 – Jarryd Roughead
 Most tackles: 1,233 – Liam Shiels
 Most games coached: 351 – Alastair Clarkson
 Most victories coached: 216 – Alastair Clarkson
 Most home and away games coached: 325 – Alastair Clarkson
 Most home and away victories coached: 200 – Alastair Clarkson
 Most rebound 50's in a season: 137 – James Sicily
 Most rebound 50's in a single game: 15 – James Sicily (Tied with Luke Hodge)

Milestones
 Round 1
 Jarman Impey – 100th AFL game.
 Ben McEvoy – 50th goal for Hawthorn.
 Jack Scrimshaw – Hawthorn debut.

 Round 2
 Tom Scully – Hawthorn debut.

 Round 3
 Dylan Moore – AFL debut.
 Chad Wingard – Hawthorn debut
 Chad Wingard – 1st goal for Hawthorn.

 Round 4
 Ben McEvoy – 100th game for Hawthorn.
 Tom Scully – 1st goal for Hawthorn.

 Round 5
 Chad Wingard – 150th AFL game.
 Mitchell Lewis – 1st AFL goal.

 Round 6
 Blake Hardwick – 50th AFL game.

 Round 7
 Jaeger O'Meara – 50th AFL goal.

 Round 8
 Jack Gunston – 350th AFL goal.

 Round 9
 Tim O'Brien – 50th AFL game.
 Dylan Moore – 1st AFL goal.

 Round 10
 Ricky Henderson – 50th game for Hawthorn.

 Round 13
 Jarman Impey – 50th AFL goal.
 Conor Glass – 1st AFL goal.

 Round 15
 Oliver Hanrahan – AFL debut
 Oliver Hanrahan – 1st AFL goal.

 Round 16
 Luke Breust – 200th AFL game.
 Ben McEvoy – 200th AFL game.

 Round 18
 Liam Shiels – 200th AFL game.

 Round 21
 Ricky Henderson – 150th AFL game.
 Changkuoth Jiath – AFL debut.

 Round 22
 Alastair Clarkson – 350th AFL game as coach.

 Round 23
 Isaac Smith – 200th AFL game.
 Alastair Clarkson – 200th Home and Away game won as coach.

References

Hawthorn Football Club Season, 2019
Hawthorn Football Club seasons